The Messerschmitt Me 509 was an all-metal fighter project, underway in Germany during World War II.

Development
Not much information about this project has survived. It was based on the Me 309 but with the engine located behind a pressurized cockpit, much in a similar manner to the US Bell P-39 Airacobra.

The engine was a Daimler-Benz DB 605B driving a three-blade propeller, and armament was to consist of two 13 mm (.51 in) MG 131 machine guns and two 20 mm MG 151/20 cannon. The tricycle landing gear from the Me 309 was retained, which worked better on the 509, due to the lower weight on the nosewheel - the Me 309's nosegear had collapsed during trials. The smaller nose would have improved visibility. The project was cancelled along with the Me 309, but the Japanese made a similar aircraft, the Yokosuka R2Y Keiun, which suffered from engine overheating.

Specifications (as designed)

See also

References

External links

Me 509 Model

Me 509
Abandoned military aircraft projects of Germany
Single-engined tractor aircraft
Low-wing aircraft